Les Pays-d'En-Haut is a regional county municipality in the Laurentides region of Quebec, Canada. The population according to the 2016 Canadian Census was 41,877.

Subdivisions
There are 10 subdivisions within the RCM:

Cities & Towns (4)
 Estérel
 Sainte-Adèle
 Sainte-Marguerite-du-Lac-Masson
 Saint-Sauveur

Municipalities (5)
 Lac-des-Seize-Îles
 Morin-Heights
 Piedmont
 Saint-Adolphe-d'Howard
 Wentworth-Nord

Parishes (1)
 Sainte-Anne-des-Lacs

Demographics

Population

Language

Transportation

Access Routes
Highways and numbered routes that run through the municipality, including external routes that start or finish at the county border:

 Autoroutes
 

 Principal Highways
 

 Secondary Highways
 
 
 

 External Routes
 None

See also
 List of regional county municipalities and equivalent territories in Quebec

References

External links 
 Official Web site of MRC Les Pays d'En Haut

Regional county municipalities in Laurentides
Census divisions of Quebec